Richard Clarke (born 20 November 1968, in Toronto) is a Canadian former yacht racer who competed in the 1996 Summer Olympics, in the 2000 Summer Olympics, in the 2004 Summer Olympics, and in the 2012 Summer Olympics.

In 2001-02, he was a crewmember on Illbruck in the Volvo Ocean Race.

References

1968 births
Living people
Sportspeople from Toronto
Canadian male sailors (sport)
Olympic sailors of Canada
Sailors at the 1996 Summer Olympics – Finn
Sailors at the 2000 Summer Olympics – Finn
Sailors at the 2004 Summer Olympics – Finn
Sailors at the 2012 Summer Olympics – Star
Pan American Games gold medalists for Canada
Sailors at the 1999 Pan American Games
Pan American Games medalists in sailing
Volvo Ocean Race sailors
Medalists at the 1999 Pan American Games
20th-century Canadian people
21st-century Canadian people